The Berkley Center for Religion, Peace, and World Affairs is an academic research center at Georgetown University in Washington, DC dedicated to the interdisciplinary study of religion, ethics, and politics. The center was founded in 2006 under a gift from William R. Berkley, a member of Georgetown's Board of Directors. The center's founding director is Thomas Banchoff.

Senior Fellows

Senior Research Fellows

Faculty Fellows

Research Fellows

References

External links
 

Georgetown University programs
Religious studies
Religion and society in the United States
Freedom of religion